Rose Elizabeth Fitzgerald Kennedy (July 22, 1890 – January 22, 1995) was an American philanthropist, socialite, and matriarch of the Kennedy family. She was deeply embedded in the "lace curtain" Irish American community in Boston. Her father, John F. Fitzgerald, served in the Massachusetts State Senate (1892–1894), in the U.S. House of Representatives (1895–1901, 1919), and as Mayor of Boston (1906–1908, 1910–1914). Her husband, Joseph P. Kennedy Sr., chaired the U.S. Securities and Exchange Commission (1934-1935) and the U.S. Maritime Commission (1937–1938), and served as United States Ambassador to the United Kingdom (1938–1940). Their nine children included United States President John F. Kennedy, U.S. Senator Robert F. Kennedy of New York, U.S. Senator Ted Kennedy of Massachusetts, Special Olympics founder Eunice Kennedy Shriver, and U.S. Ambassador to Ireland Jean Kennedy Smith.

In 1951, Rose Kennedy was ennobled by Pope Pius XII, becoming the sixth American woman to be granted the rank of Papal countess.

Early life
Rose Elizabeth Fitzgerald was born on July 22, 1890 at 4 Garden Court in the North End neighborhood of Boston, Massachusetts. She was the eldest of six children born to John Francis "Honey Fitz" Fitzgerald, at the time a member of the Boston Common Council, and the former Mary Josephine "Josie" Hannon. Her siblings were Agnes, Thomas, John Jr., Eunice, and Frederick.

At age 7 her family moved to West Concord, Massachusetts and in 1904 moved again into an Italianate/Mansard-style home in the Ashmont Hill section of Dorchester, Massachusetts and attended the local Girls' Latin School. The home later burned down, but a plaque at Welles Avenue and Harley Street proclaims Rose Fitzgerald Kennedy Square. The plaque was dedicated by her son, U.S. Senator Ted Kennedy, on her 102nd birthday in July 1992.

Fitzgerald studied at the convent school Kasteel Bloemendal in Vaals, Netherlands, and graduated from Dorchester High School in 1906. She also attended the New England Conservatory in Boston, where she studied piano. After being refused permission by her father to attend Wellesley College, Fitzgerald enrolled at the Manhattanville College of the Sacred Heart (as it was then known) in Manhattan, an institution that did not grant degrees at the time. Kennedy later said that her greatest regret was "not having gone to Wellesley College," saying that it was "something I have felt a little sad about all my life." However, Rose eventually grew fond of the convent school, saying that the religious training she received became the foundation of her life. 

In 1908, Fitzgerald and her father embarked on a tour of Europe and had a private audience with Pope Pius X at the Vatican.

Marriage and family life

In her teens, Rose became acquainted with her future husband, Joseph Patrick "Joe" Kennedy, whom she met while their families were vacationing in Maine. He was the elder son of businessman/politician Patrick Joseph "P.J." Kennedy (a political rival of Honey Fitz) and Mary Augusta Hickey. Kennedy would go on to court Fitzgerald for more than seven years, much to her father's disapproval of him. 

On October 7, 1914, at age 24, she married Kennedy in a modest ceremony at the small chapel of the residence of Archbishop William Henry O'Connell in Boston. They initially lived in a home in Brookline, Massachusetts that is now the John Fitzgerald Kennedy National Historic Site, and later a 15-room vacation home at Hyannis Port on Cape Cod, which became the Kennedy family's lasting base. Their nine children were Joseph Jr. (Joe), John (Jack), Rose (Rosemary), Kathleen (Kick), Eunice, Patricia (Pat), Robert (Bobby), Jean, and Edward (Ted).

Joseph provided well for their family, but he was unfaithful. His affairs included one with Gloria Swanson. When Rose was eight months pregnant with the couple's fourth child, Kathleen, she temporarily went back to her parents, returning to Joseph after her father told her divorce was not an option. In turning a blind eye to her husband's affairs, Rose depended heavily on medication. Ronald Kessler found records for prescription tranquilizers Seconal, Placidyl, Librium, and Dalmane to relieve Rose's nervousness and stress, and Lomotil, Bentyl, Librax, and Tagamet for her stomach.

Rose Kennedy was a strict Catholic throughout her life. Even after her 100th birthday, she rarely missed Sunday Mass and maintained an "extremely prudish" exterior. Her strict beliefs often placed her at odds with her children. Jacqueline Kennedy described her mother-in-law in her correspondence to Father Joseph Leonard, an Irish priest: "I don't think Jack's mother is too bright – and she would rather say a rosary than read a book."

Rose Kennedy stated that she felt completely fulfilled as a full-time homemaker. In her 1974 autobiography, Times to Remember, she wrote, "I looked on child rearing not only as a work of love and a duty, but as a profession that was fully as interesting and challenging as any honorable profession in the world and one that demanded the best I could bring to it..... What greater aspiration and challenge are there for a mother than the hope of raising a great son or daughter?"

Children

Later years

After her son John was elected president in 1960, Rose "became a sort of quiet celebrity" and appeared on the International Best Dressed List. Most of her social activities consisted of involvement in charities and women's groups. Rose also took brisk ocean swims outside her Cape Cod house.

After suffering a stroke in 1984, she used a wheelchair for the remaining eleven years of her life. She maintained her residence at the Kennedy Compound in Hyannis Port, Massachusetts and was cared for by private nurses and staff. She turned 100 years old on July 22, 1990.

Death
On January 22, 1995, Kennedy died from complications from pneumonia at age 104 at the Kennedy family compound in Hyannis Port. She was survived by five of her nine children as well as many grandchildren and great-grandchildren. She was interred with her husband at Holyhood Cemetery in Brookline, Massachusetts.

Legacy
In 1951, Pope Pius XII granted Kennedy the title of countess in recognition of her "exemplary motherhood and many charitable works." In 1992, when she turned 102, the intersection of Welles Avenue and Harley Street in Boston was proclaimed "Rose Fitzgerald Kennedy Square". The plaque was dedicated by her son, Senator Edward M. Kennedy. Also, the Rose Kennedy Greenway in Boston, Massachusetts – the park that was created when the city's Central Artery was sunk below ground level in the "Big Dig" – was named after her on July 26, 2004. Well known for her philanthropic efforts and for leading the Grandparents' Parade at age 90 at the Special Olympics, Kennedy's life and work are documented in the Oscar-nominated short documentary Rose Kennedy: A Life to Remember. She was a lifelong autograph collector.

The Rose Fitzgerald Kennedy Bridge in Ireland is named after her.  As of its 2020 opening it is the longest bridge in Ireland.

Written works

References

Further reading
 Nasaw, David. The Patriarch: The Remarkable Life and Turbulent Times of Joseph P. Kennedy (2012), scholarly biography of her husband
 Perry, Barbara A. Rose Kennedy: The Life and Times of a Political Matriarch  (W.W. Norton & Company; 2013)
 Shriver, Timothy. "Fully Alive: Discovering What Matters Most," (Sarah Crichton Books-Farrar, Straus and Giroux, 2014)

External links

JFK Library: Rose Fitzgerald Kennedy

1890 births
1995 deaths
American centenarians
20th-century American memoirists
American people of Irish descent
American socialites
Burials at Holyhood Cemetery (Brookline)
Deaths from pneumonia in Massachusetts
Rose
Manhattanville College alumni
Massachusetts Democrats
Mothers of presidents of the United States
New England Conservatory alumni
People from Hyannis, Massachusetts
People from North End, Boston
Papal countesses
American women memoirists
Writers from Boston
Catholics from Massachusetts
Women centenarians